English pop singer Shayne Ward has released four studio albums and sixteen singles.

Shayne Ward, Ward's debut studio album was released in April 2006, the album peaked at No. 1 on the UK Albums Chart. Immediately after his victory on The X Factor, Ward signed a recording contract with Syco Music and his first single, "That's My Goal", was released in the UK on 21 December 2005. It became the Christmas number one single of 2005. Ward's second single, "No Promises", a cover of a Bryan Rice song was released on 10 April 2006, and peaked at No. 2 on the UK Singles Chart. Ward's third single "Stand by Me" peaked at No. 14 on the UK Singles Chart.

Breathless, Ward's second studio album was released in November 2007, the album peaked to No. 2 on the UK Albums Chart. "If That's OK with You" was given a release date of 20 August 2007, but was then delayed and became a double A-side single with "No U Hang Up". It was finally released on 24 September 2007, and peaked at No. 2 on the UK Singles Chart. "Breathless" was released on 19 November 2007 as the second single and peaked at No. 6 on the UK Singles Chart.

Obsession, Ward's third studio album was released in November 2010, the album peaked at No. 15 on the UK Albums Chart. The first single from the album is a cover version of Nickelback's 2008 single, "Gotta Be Somebody". It was released on 7 November 2010 and peaked at number 12 on the UK Singles Chart.

Closer, Ward's fourth studio album was released in April 2015. "My Heart Would Take You Back" was released as the lead single from the album on 12 April 2015.

Albums

Studio albums

Box Set

Singles

As lead artist

As featured artist

Promotional singles

References

Footnotes

Citations

External links

Pop music discographies
Discographies of British artists